Jesse J. Phillips (February 22, 1837 – February 16, 1901) was an American jurist and military officer.

Biography
Born in Montgomery County, Illinois, Phillips served in the 9th Illinois Volunteer Infantry Regiment during the American Civil War and was brevetted brigadier general. In 1879, Phillips was elected an Illinois circuit court judge. He served on the Illinois Supreme Court from 1893 until his death in 1901 and was chief justice in 1897. Phillips died at his home in Hillsboro, Illinois.

References

External links

1837 births
1901 deaths
People from Hillsboro, Illinois
People of Illinois in the American Civil War
Illinois state court judges
Chief Justices of the Illinois Supreme Court
Union Army officers
19th-century American judges
Justices of the Illinois Supreme Court